Morag was a moshav and an Israeli settlement in Gush Katif, in the south-west edge of the Gaza Strip, evacuated in Israel's disengagement of 2005.

History
Morag, was the southernmost settlement in Gush Katif. It was first established on 29 May 1972, as a non-religious pioneer Nahal military outpost, and demilitarized when turned over to residential purposes in 1982. It later became a religious agricultural worker cooperative, whose residents earned their living growing flowers and vegetables in hothouses. At the time of the evacuation, there were about forty families including about 200 people.

Unilateral disengagement 
Sixteen families of Morag were evicted on August 17, 2005, by the Israel Defense Forces and Israeli Police. Others had left earlier following the government orders.

Palestinian Plans
On the ruins of the former village, an Arab locality has been announced called Sheikh Khalifa City. The site named after United Arab Emirates President Khalifa bin Zayed Al Nahyan due to his funding of the project.

References

Former Israeli settlements in the Gaza Strip
Religious Israeli settlements
Former moshavim
Nahal settlements
Villages depopulated during the Arab–Israeli conflict
Populated places established in 1983